MasterChef is a Polish television series based on a British television cooking game show under the same title. It premiered on TVN on 2 September 2012. The show is hosted by Magda Gessler, who also hosts a Polish version of Kitchen Nightmares (Kuchenne rewolucje) on the same channel. She also serves as the head judge and is joined on the panel by Michel Moran and Anna Starmach. It was broadcast on Sundays; seasons 1–3 were at 8 p.m., while season 4 was at 9:30 p.m.

Series overview

MasterChef Seasons

Season I

Elimination table

 (WINNER) This chef won the competition.
 (RUNNER-UP) This chef received second place in the competition.
 (WIN) The chef won the individual challenge (Mystery Box Challenge or Invention Test) and received an advantage in the next challenge.
 (WIN) The chef was on the winning team in the Team Challenge and was safe from the Pressure Test.
 (IMM) The chef won the Mystery Box Challenge and did not have to compete in the Elimination Test.
 (HIGH) The chef was one of the top entries in the individual challenge, but did not win.
 (IN) The chef was not selected as a top entry or bottom entry in the challenge.
 (PT) The chef was on the losing team in the Team Challenge (except episode 11 — an Individual Challenge), competed in the pressure test, and advanced.
 (NPT) The chef was on the losing team in the Team Challenge, but did not compete in the pressure test, and advanced.
 (LOW) The chef was one of the bottom entries in an individual elimination challenge, but was not the last person to advance.
 (LOW) The chef was one of the bottom entries in an individual elimination challenge, and was the last person to advance.
 (ELIM) The chef was eliminated from MasterChef.
 (WDR) The chef withdrew from the competition.
 (ELIM) The chef was eliminated from MasterChef but returned.

Special Guests
 6 episode – Kurt Scheller
 9 episode – Rick Stein, Piotr Bikont, Ewa Wachowicz
 10 episode – Joe Bastianich
 12 episode – Jordi Cruz

Ratings

Season II

Elimination table

 (WINNER) This chef won the competition.
 (RUNNER-UP) This chef received second place in the competition.
 (WIN) The chef won the individual challenge (Mystery Box Challenge or Invention Test) and received an advantage in the next challenge.
 (WIN) The chef was on the winning team in the Team Challenge and was safe from the Pressure Test.
 (IMM) The chef won the Mystery Box Challenge and did not have to compete in the Elimination Test.
 (HIGH) The chef was one of the top entries in the individual challenge, but did not win.
 (IN) The chef was not selected as a top entry or bottom entry in the challenge.
 (PT) The chef was on the losing team in the Team Challenge (except episode 11 — an Individual Challenge), competed in the pressure test, and advanced.
 (NPT) The chef was on the losing team in the Team Challenge, but did not compete in the pressure test, and advanced.
 (LOW) The chef was one of the bottom entries in an individual elimination challenge, but was not the last person to advance.
 (LOW) The chef was one of the bottom entries in an individual elimination challenge, and was the last person to advance.
 (ELIM) The chef was eliminated from MasterChef.
 (WDR) The chef voluntarily withdrew from the competition.
 (ELIM) The chef was eliminated from MasterChef but returned.

Special Guests
 4 episode – Basia Ritz (season 1 winner)
 9 episode – Rafał Targosz
 10 episode – Marco Pierre White
 11 episode – Grzegorz Olejarka
 11–13 episode – Alia Al Kasimi
 14 episode – Kurt Scheller

Ratings

Season III

Elimination table

 (WINNER) This chef won the competition.
 (RUNNER-UP) This chef received second place in the competition.
 (WIN) The chef won the individual challenge (Mystery Box Challenge or Invention Test) and received an advantage in the next challenge.
 (WIN) The chef was on the winning team in the Team Challenge or Duet Challenge and was safe from the Pressure Test.
 (IMM) The chef won the Mystery Box Challenge and did not have to compete in the Elimination Test.
 (HIGH) The chef was one of the top entries in the individual challenge, but did not win.
 (IN) The chef was not selected as a top entry or bottom entry in the challenge.
 (PT) The chef was on the losing team in the Team Challenge, competed in the pressure test, and advanced.
 (NPT) The chef was on the losing team in the Team Challenge, but did not compete in the pressure test, and advanced.
 (LOW) The chef was one of the bottom entries in an individual elimination challenge, but was not the last person to advance.
 (LOW) The chef was one of the bottom entries in an individual elimination challenge, and was the last person to advance.
 (ELIM) The chef was eliminated from MasterChef.
 (WDR) The chef withdrew due to illness or personal reason.
 (ELIM) The chef was eliminated from MasterChef but returned.

Special Guests
 6 episode – Beata Śniechowska (season 2 winner)
 7 episode – Gordon Ramsay
 8 episode – Michel Roux
 11 episode – Chun Fai Tsang
 13 episode – Ciccio Sultano

Ratings

Season IV

Elimination table

 (WINNER) This chef won the competition.
 (RUNNER-UP) This chef received second place in the competition.
 (WIN) The chef won the individual challenge (Mystery Box Challenge or Invention Test) and received an advantage in the next challenge.
 (WIN) The chef was on the winning team in the Team Challenge and was safe from the Pressure Test.
 (IMM) The chef won the Mystery Box Challenge and did not have to compete in the Elimination Test.
 (HIGH) The chef was one of the top entries in the individual challenge, but did not win.
 (IN) The chef was not selected as a top entry or bottom entry in the challenge.
 (PT) The chef was on the losing team in the Team Challenge (except episode 11 — an Individual Challenge), competed in the pressure test, and advanced.
 (NPT) The chef was on the losing team in the Team Challenge, but did not compete in the pressure test, and advanced.
 (LOW) The chef was one of the bottom entries in an individual elimination challenge, but was not the last person to advance.
 (LOW) The chef was one of the bottom entries in an individual elimination challenge, and was the last person to advance.
 (ELIM) The chef was eliminated from MasterChef.
 (QUIT) The chef voluntarily left the show.
 (ELIM) The chef was eliminated from MasterChef but returned.

Ratings

Season V

Elimination table

 (WINNER) This chef won the competition.
 (RUNNER-UP) This chef received second place in the competition.
 (WIN) The chef won the individual challenge (Mystery Box Challenge or Invention Test) and received an advantage in the next challenge.
 (WIN) The chef was on the winning team in the Team Challenge and was safe from the Pressure Test.
 (IMM) The chef won the Mystery Box Challenge and did not have to compete in the Elimination Test.
 (HIGH) The chef was one of the top entries in the individual challenge, but did not win.
 (IN) The chef was not selected as a top entry or bottom entry in the challenge.
 (PT) The chef was on the losing team in the Team Challenge (except episode 11 — an Individual Challenge), competed in the pressure test, and advanced.
 (NPT) The chef was on the losing team in the Team Challenge, but did not compete in the pressure test, and advanced.
 (LOW) The chef was one of the bottom entries in an individual elimination challenge, but was not the last person to advance.
 (LOW) The chef was one of the bottom entries in an individual elimination challenge, and was the last person to advance.
 (ELIM) The chef was eliminated from MasterChef.
 (WDR) The chef voluntarily withdrew from the show.
 (ELIM) The chef was eliminated from MasterChef but returned.

Ratings

Season VI

Elimination table

 (WINNER) This chef won the competition.
 (RUNNER-UP) This chef received second place in the competition.
 (WIN) The chef won the individual challenge (Mystery Box Challenge or Invention Test) and received an advantage in the next challenge.
 (WIN) The chef was on the winning team in the Team Challenge and was safe from the Pressure Test.
 (IMM) The chef won the Mystery Box Challenge and did not have to compete in the Elimination Test.
 (HIGH) The chef was one of the top entries in the individual challenge, but did not win.
 (IN) The chef was not selected as a top entry or bottom entry in the challenge.
 (PT) The chef was on the losing team in the Team Challenge (except episode 11 — an Individual Challenge), competed in the pressure test, and advanced.
 (NPT) The chef was on the losing team in the Team Challenge, but did not compete in the pressure test, and advanced.
 (LOW) The chef was one of the bottom entries in an individual elimination challenge, but was not the last person to advance.
 (LOW) The chef was one of the bottom entries in an individual elimination challenge, and was the last person to advance.
 (ELIM) The chef was eliminated from MasterChef.
 (WDR) The chef voluntarily withdrew from the competition.
 (ELIM) The chef was eliminated from MasterChef but returned.

Ratings

Season VII

Elimination table

 (WINNER) This chef won the competition.
 (RUNNER-UP) This chef received second place in the competition.
 (WIN) The chef won the individual challenge (Mystery Box Challenge or Invention Test) and received an advantage in the next challenge.
 (WIN) The chef was on the winning team in the Team Challenge and was safe from the Pressure Test.
 (IMM) The chef won and did not have to compete in the Elimination Test.
 (HIGH) The chef was one of the top entries in the individual challenge, but did not win.
 (IN) The chef was not selected as a top entry or bottom entry in the challenge.
 (PT) The chef was on the losing team in the Team Challenge 
 (LOW) The chef was one of the bottom entries in an individual elimination challenge, but was not the last person to advance.
 (LOW) The chef was one of the bottom entries in an individual elimination challenge, and was the last person to advance.
 (ELIM) The chef was eliminated from MasterChef.

Ratings

Season VIII

Elimination table

 (WINNER) This chef won the competition.
 (RUNNER-UP) This chef received second place in the competition.
 (WIN) The chef won the individual challenge (Mystery Box Challenge or Invention Test) and received an advantage in the next challenge.
 (WIN) The chef was on the winning team in the Team Challenge and was safe from the Pressure Test.
 (IMM) The chef won and did not have to compete in the Elimination Test.
 (HIGH) The chef was one of the top entries in the individual challenge, but did not win.
 (IN) The chef was not selected as a top entry or bottom entry in the challenge.
 (PT) The chef was on the losing team in the Team Challenge 
 (LOW) The chef was one of the bottom entries in an individual elimination challenge, but was not the last person to advance.
 (LOW) The chef was one of the bottom entries in an individual elimination challenge, and was the last person to advance.
 (ELIM) The chef was eliminated from MasterChef.

Ratings

Season IX

Elimination table

 (WINNER) This chef won the competition.
 (RUNNER-UP) This chef received second place in the competition.
 (WIN) The chef won the individual challenge (Mystery Box Challenge or Invention Test) and received an advantage in the next challenge.
 (WIN) The chef was on the winning team in the Team Challenge and was safe from the Pressure Test.
 (IMM) The chef won and did not have to compete in the Elimination Test.
 (HIGH) The chef was one of the top entries in the individual challenge, but did not win.
 (IN) The chef was not selected as a top entry or bottom entry in the challenge.
 (PT) The chef was on the losing team in the Team Challenge 
 (LOW) The chef was one of the bottom entries in an individual elimination challenge, but was not the last person to advance.
 (LOW) The chef was one of the bottom entries in an individual elimination challenge, and was the last person to advance.
 (ELIM) The chef was eliminated from MasterChef.

Ratings

Season X

Elimination table

 (WINNER) This chef won the competition.
 (RUNNER-UP) This chef received second place in the competition.
 (WIN) The chef won the individual challenge (Mystery Box Challenge or Invention Test) and received an advantage in the next challenge.
 (WIN) The chef was on the winning team in the Team Challenge and was safe from the Pressure Test.
 (IMM) The chef won and did not have to compete in the Elimination Test.
 (HIGH) The chef was one of the top entries in the individual challenge, but did not win.
 (IN) The chef was not selected as a top entry or bottom entry in the challenge.
 (PT) The chef was on the losing team in the Team Challenge 
 (LOW) The chef was one of the bottom entries in an individual elimination challenge, but was not the last person to advance.
 (LOW) The chef was one of the bottom entries in an individual elimination challenge, and was the last person to advance.
 (ELIM) The chef was eliminated from MasterChef.

Ratings

MasterChef Junior Seasons 

MasterChef Junior is a Polish television series based on a British television cooking game show under the same title. It premiered on TVN on 21 February 2016. The judging panel is composed of Anna Starmach, Michel Moran and Mateusz Gessler. It was broadcast on Sundays at 8 p.m.

Season I

Elimination table 

 (WINNER) This chef won the competition.
 (RUNNER-UP) This chef received second place in the competition.
 (WIN) The chef won the individual challenge (Mystery Box Challenge or Invention Test) and received an advantage in the next challenge.
 (WIN) The chef was on the winning team in the Team Challenge and was safe from the Pressure Test.
 (IMM) The chef won the Mystery Box Challenge and did not have to compete in the Elimination Test.
 (HIGH) The chef was one of the top entries in the individual challenge, but did not win.
 (IN) The chef was not selected as a top entry or bottom entry in the challenge.
 (PT) The chef was on the losing team in the Team Challenge 
 (LOW) The chef was one of the bottom entries in an individual elimination challenge, but was not the last person to advance.
 (LOW) The chef was one of the bottom entries in an individual elimination challenge, and was the last person to advance.
 (ELIM) The chef was eliminated from MasterChef.

Ratings

Season II 

Special guestes:
 Episode 3 – Natalia Paździor (MasterChef Junior Season 1 Winner)

Elimination table 

 (WINNER) This chef won the competition.
 (RUNNER-UP) This chef received second place in the competition.
 (WIN) The chef won the individual challenge (Mystery Box Challenge or Invention Test) and received an advantage in the next challenge.
 (WIN) The chef was on the winning team in the Team Challenge and was safe from the Pressure Test.
 (IMM) The chef won the Mystery Box Challenge and did not have to compete in the Elimination Test.
 (HIGH) The chef was one of the top entries in the individual challenge, but did not win.
 (IN) The chef was not selected as a top entry or bottom entry in the challenge.
 (PT) The chef was on the losing team in the Team Challenge
 (LOW) The chef was one of the bottom entries in an individual elimination challenge, and was the last person to advance.
 (ELIM) The chef was eliminated from MasterChef.

Ratings

Season III 

Special guests:
 Episode 5: Hubert Urbański
 Episode 7: Paweł Kras
 Episode 8: Tomasz Leśniak; Mateusz Zielonka (MasterChef Season 6 Winner)
 Episode 9: Łukasz Konik

Elimination table 

 (WINNER) This chef won the competition.
 (RUNNER-UP) This chef received second place in the competition.
 (WIN) The chef won the individual challenge (Mystery Box Challenge or Invention Test) and received an advantage in the next challenge.
 (WIN) The chef was on the winning team in the Team Challenge and was safe from the Pressure Test.
 (IMM) The chef won the Mystery Box Challenge and did not have to compete in the Elimination Test.
 (HIGH) The chef was one of the top entries in the individual challenge, but did not win.
 (IN) The chef was not selected as a top entry or bottom entry in the challenge.
 (PT) The chef was on the losing team in the Team Challenge
 (LOW) The chef was one of the bottom entries in an individual elimination challenge, and was the last person to advance.
 (LOW) The chef was one of the bottom entries in an individual elimination challenge, but was not the last person to advance.
 (ELIM) The chef was eliminated from MasterChef.

Ratings

Season IV 

Special guestes:
 Episode 3: Robert Makłowicz
 Episode 4: Magda Gessler
 Episode 5: Ola Nguyen (MasterChef Season 7 Winner), Dominika Wójciak (MasterChef Season 3 Winner)
 Episode 6: Krzysztof Salwa, Ewa Drzyzga, Dominika Wójciak (MasterChef Season 3 Winner), MasterChef Season 6 Contestants (Mateusz Zielonka, Matteo Brunnetti, Damian Sobek, Natalia Gmyrek, Mateusz Güncel), MasterChef Season 7 All Top 14 Contestants (Aleksandra "Ola" Nguyen, Laurentiu "Lorek" Zediu, Martyna Chomacka, Mateusz Krojenka, Krzysztof Bigus, Ewa Szczęsna, Wojciech Kasprowicz, Arkadiusz Prunesti, Patrycja Rygusiak, Karolina Kowalewska, Mateusz Ratajczyk, Mateusz Ratajczyk, Natalia Maszkowska, Tomasz Borecki, Bartek Kazimierczak)
 Episode 7: Mateusz Zielonka (MasterChef Season 6 Winner)
 Episode 8: Andrea Camastra
 Episode 9: Mateusz Zielonka (MasterChef Season 7 Winner), Natalia Paździor (MasterChef Junior Season 1 Winner), Julia Cymbaluk (MasterChef Junior Season 2 Winner), Bartosz Kwiecień (MasterChef Junior Season 3 Winner)

 (WINNER) This chef won the competition.
 (RUNNER-UP) This chef received second place in the competition.
 (WIN) The chef won the individual challenge (Mystery Box Challenge or Invention Test) and received an advantage in the next challenge.
 (WIN) The chef was on the winning team in the Team Challenge and was safe from the Pressure Test.
 (IMM) The chef won the Mystery Box Challenge and did not have to compete in the Elimination Test.
 (HIGH) The chef was one of the top entries in the individual challenge, but did not win.
 (IN) The chef was not selected as a top entry or bottom entry in the challenge.
 (PT) The chef was on the losing team in the Team Challenge 
 (LOW) The chef was one of the bottom entries in an individual elimination challenge, and was the last person to advance.
 (ELIM) The chef was eliminated from MasterChef.
 (WDR) The chef voluntarily withdrew from the show.

Ratings

Season V 

Special guests:
 Episode 5: Wojciech Modest Amaro
 Episode 6: Magdalena Nowaczewska (MasterChef Season 5 Winner); Damian Sobek & Mateusz Güncel (MasterChef Season 6 Finalists); Maria Ożga (MasterChef Season 2 Runner-Up); Anna Kawa-Kułyk (MasterChef Season 5 Finalist); Grzegorz Bien (MasterChef Season 5 Contestant); Jakub Tomaszczyk (MasterChef Junior Season 2 Runner-Up); Hanna Kandora, Anastazja Czyż, Mateusz Oleksa, Maja Tokarska & Zuzanna Bula (MasterChef Junior Season 3 Contestants), Nikola Stępień (MasterChef Junior Season 4 Conestants); Bartek Kulik & Michał Grząśko  (MasterChef Junior Season 1 Contestants)
 Episode 8: Ola Nguyen (MasterChef Season 7 Winner)
 Episode 9: Grzegorz Zawierucha (MasterChef Season 8 Winner), Paulina Foremny (MasterChef Junior Season 4 Winner), Magic of Y

 (WINNER) This chef won the competition.
 (RUNNER-UP) This chef received second place in the competition.
 (WIN) The chef won the individual challenge (Mystery Box Challenge or Invention Test) and received an advantage in the next challenge.
 (WIN) The chef was on the winning team in the Team Challenge and was safe from the Pressure Test.
 (IMM) The chef won the Mystery Box Challenge and did not have to compete in the Elimination Test.
 (HIGH) The chef was one of the top entries in the individual challenge, but did not win.
 (IN) The chef was not selected as a top entry or bottom entry in the challenge.
 (PT) The chef was on the losing team in the Team Challenge 
 (LOW) The chef was one of the bottom entries in an individual elimination challenge, and was the last person to advance.
 (ELIM) The chef was eliminated from MasterChef.

Ratings

Season VI 

 (WINNER) This chef won the competition.
 (RUNNER-UP) This chef received second place in the competition.
 (WIN) The chef won the individual challenge (Mystery Box Challenge or Invention Test) and received an advantage in the next challenge.
 (WIN) The chef was on the winning team in the Team Challenge and was safe from the Pressure Test.
 (IMM) The chef won the Mystery Box Challenge and did not have to compete in the Elimination Test.
 (HIGH) The chef was one of the top entries in the individual challenge, but did not win.
 (IN) The chef was not selected as a top entry or bottom entry in the challenge.
 (PT) The chef was on the losing team in the Team Challenge 
 (LOW) The chef was one of the bottom entries in an individual elimination challenge, and was the last person to advance.
 (ELIM) The chef was eliminated from MasterChef.

Ratings

Rating Figures

References

Poland
Polish reality television series
2012 Polish television series debuts
TVN (Polish TV channel) original programming
Polish television series based on British television series